The BQE is a mixed-medium artistic exploration of the Brooklyn-Queens Expressway by Sufjan Stevens. The project originally manifested in the form of a live show, performed on November 1–3, 2007. The show consisted of an original film, directed and written by Stevens, accompanied by an orchestra performing a live soundtrack.

The album recording was made after the rehearsals for the show.  It was recorded live during a one-day session in Legacy Studios' A509 orchestral suite (since closed and demolished) with most of the group in the same large room together.

A multimedia package of The BQE was released on October 20, 2009. The set consists of a CD of the show's soundtrack, a DVD of Brooklyn-Queen Expressway footage that accompanied the original performance (not a film of the performance itself), a 40-page booklet with liner notes and photos, and a stereoscopic 3D View-Master reel. There is also a limited edition version that features the soundtrack on 180-gram vinyl and a 40-page BQE-themed comic book starring the show's hula-hooping wonder women, The Hooper Heroes.

Regarding The BQE, Stevens said:

Ballet
Justin Peck's ballet, In the Countenance of Kings, is set to music from The BQE, made for the San Francisco Ballet.

Track listing

Personnel
Production
 Alejandro Venguer, assisted by Jeff Kirby and Tyler Van Dalen – recording, legacy studios, New York City
 Casey Foubert, James McAlister, and Sufjan Stevens – additional recording, Sufjan's office in Brooklyn
 Sufjan Stevens – mixing
 Lisa Moran – production management
 Michael Atkinson – music editing, copyist

Performing artists

 Tim Albright – trombone
 Hideaki Aomori – clarinet
 Mat Fieldes – upright bass
 Casey Foubert – electric guitar
 Josh Frank – trumpet
 Alan Hampton – upright bass
 Marla Hansen – viola, vocals
 Jay Hassler – bass clarinet, clarinet
 Maria Bella Jeffers – cello
 Ben Lanz – trombone
 Olivier Manchon – violin
 Rob Moose – violin
 Sato Moughalian – flute, piccolo
 Damian Primis – bassoon

 Theo Primis – French horn
 Joey Redhage – cello
 Kyle Resnick – trumpet
 Yuuki Matthews – bass, beats
 Beth Meyers – viola
 James McAlister – drums, percussion, drum programming, sequencing, synthesizers, sound effects, etc.
 Matt Moran – drums, percussion
 Arthur Sato – oboe
 Alex Sopp – flute, alto flute, piccolo
 Hiroko Taguchi – violin
 Amie Weiss – violin
 Sufjan Stevens – "everything else"
 Michael Atkinson – conductor

BQE Film
 Anastasia-Dyan Pridlides – botanica
 Elaine Tian – quantus
 Lindsay Brickel – electress
 Sufjan Stevens – direction, cinematography, editing
 Reuben Kleiner – cinematography, editing
 Malcolm Hearn – editing
 Bryant Fisher and Blink Digital – post-production

Packaging
 Denny Renshaw – photography
 Anastasia-Dyan Pridlides – botanica
 Elaine Tian – quantus
 Lindsay Brickel – electress
 Stephen Halker – bailey
 Virginia Bradley Linzee – makeup
 Belinda Martin – wardrobe
 Caroline McAlister – costume design, costumes
 Sufjan Stevens – photography, layout, design, illustrations

"Hooper Heroes" Comic Book/Stereoscopic Reel
 Sufjan Stevens – story, writing
 Stephen Halker – story, penciling, inking, lettering, coloring
 Heidi Cho – coloring
 David Min – coloring
 Matt Loux – cover watercolour
 Christian Ackler – cover masthead

Charts

References

External links
Asthmatic Kitty Records' page for The BQE

Sufjan Stevens soundtracks
Film soundtracks
Interstate 78
Concept albums
2009 soundtrack albums
Albums produced by Sufjan Stevens
Asthmatic Kitty soundtracks
Instrumental soundtracks